Six ships of the Royal Navy have borne the name HMS Philomel, after Philomela, a figure in Greek mythology: 

 was an 18-gun  launched in 1806 and sold in 1817.
 was a 10-gun  launched in 1823 and sold in 1833.
 was an 8-gun brig launched in 1842. She was transferred to the Coastguard as a watchvessel in 1857 and was renamed WV23 in 1863. She foundered in 1869 and was sold in 1870 to be salvaged and broken up.
 was a  wooden screw gunvessel launched in 1860 and sold in 1865.
 was a wooden screw gunvessel launched in 1867 and sold in 1886.
 was a  launched in 1890. She became a base ship in 1921, was sold in 1947 and scuttled in 1949.

Royal Navy ship names